The Roman Catholic Diocese of Huánuco is situated in Peru,  is a diocese located in the city of Huánuco in the Ecclesiastical province of Huancayo.

History
17 March 1865: Established as Diocese of Huánuco from the Metropolitan Archdiocese of Lima

Leadership
 Bishops of Huánuco (Roman rite), in reverse chronological order
 Bishop Neri Menor Vargas, O.F.M. (2016.05.12 - )
 Bishop Jaime Rodríguez Salazar, M.C.C.I. (2004.12.16 – 2016.05.12)
 Bishop Ermanno Artale Ciancio, S.D.B. (1994.06.21 – 2003.09.17)
 Bishop Antonio Kühner y Kühner, M.C.C.I. (1980.07.24 – 1991.01.22)
 Bishop Ignacio Arbulú Pineda (1959.02.06 – 1979.04.06)
 Bishop Teodosio Moreno Quintana (1947.06.27 – 1956.12.17), appointed Bishop of Huaraz
 Bishop Francisco Rubén Berroa y Bernedo (1922.08.12 – 1946.11.24), appointed Bishop of Ica 
 Bishop Pedro Pablo Drinot y Piérola, SS.CC. (1904.06.08 – 1920.10.21)
 Bishop Alfonso Maria de la Cruz Sardinas, O.F.M. (1890.08.10 – 1902.06)
 Bishop Manuel Teodoro del Valle (1865.03.27 – 1872.08.29), appointed Archbishop of Lima

See also
Roman Catholicism in Peru

References

 GCatholic.org
 Catholic Hierarchy

Roman Catholic dioceses in Peru
Roman Catholic Ecclesiastical Province of Huancayo
Religious organizations established in 1865
Roman Catholic dioceses and prelatures established in the 19th century
1865 establishments in Peru